Bobić, Bobic or Bobič is a surname. Notable people with the surname include:

Bernardo Bobić (? –c. 1695), Croatian painter and gilder
Ljubinka Bobić (1897–1978), Serbian actress
Fredi Bobic (1971), German football executive and former player of Slovenian descent
Predrag Bobić (born 1960), Croatian musician, guitarist and music pedagogue

Croatian surnames
Serbian surnames